Cocks is a surname. Notable people with the surname include:

Arthur Herbert Tennyson Somers-Cocks, 6th Baron Somers (1887–1944)
Arthur Percy Somers Cocks, 7th Baron Somers (1864–1953)
Charles Cocks, 1st Baron Somers (1725–1806)
Charles Cocks, British 19th century wine enthusiast, author of Cocks & Féret
Charles Somers Somers-Cocks, 3rd Earl Somers (1819–1883)
Clifford Cocks (born 1950), British cryptographer
Jay Cocks, film writer
John Patrick Somers Cocks, 8th Baron Somers (1907–1995)
John Somers Somers-Cocks, 2nd Earl Somers (1788–1852)
John Sommers Cocks, 1st Earl Somers (1760–1841)
Philip Reginald Cocks, 5th Baron Somers (1815–1899)
Philip Sebastian Somers-Cocks, 9th Baron Somers (born 1948)
Richard Cocks, English trader in Japan in the seventeenth century

See also
 Cock
 Cox
 Coxe
 Coxen
 Coxon